The Días Patrios, or Patriotic Days, are national holidays celebrated in Guatemala commemorating its struggle for independence. These include:

 September 15: Independence Day
 October 20: Day of the 1944 Revolution.

Guatemalan culture

 

Go ADD MY XBOX GAMERTAG JTCLAD